Teploklyuchenka (- Ak-Suu) is a large village in the Issyk-Kul Region of Kyrgyzstan with population of 14,009 in 2021. It is the administrative center of the Ak-Suu District and of the Teploklyuchenka village community. It was established in 1868, when 14 families of migrant peasants from Russian Empire settled near Aksuu Fort.

Population

References 

Populated places in Issyk-Kul Region